Dorcadion marmottani is a species of beetle in the family Cerambycidae. It was described by Escalera in 1900. It is known from Spain.

Varietas
 Dorcadion marmottani var. cabrasense Nicolas, 1904
 Dorcadion marmottani var. cinereotomentosum Breuning, 1947
 Dorcadion marmottani var. fuscogriseum Breuning, 1948
 Dorcadion marmottani var. fuscotomentosum Breuning, 1947
 Dorcadion marmottani var. oviforme Breuning, 1947
 Dorcadion marmottani var. sanguinipenne Breuning, 1947
 Dorcadion marmottani var. sanguinipes Breuning, 1958

See also 
Dorcadion

References

marmottani
Beetles described in 1900